Giovanni Canti (ca. 1650–1716) was an Italian painter of the Baroque. Born in Parma. Active in early 18th century. Among his pupils were Giuseppe Bazzani and Francesco Maria Raineri. He resided chiefly at Mantua, where he painted mainly battle-pieces and landscapes.

He painted an altarpiece depicting Madonna and Child and Saints for the church of Santa Maria della Carità in Mantua.

References

People from the Province of Parma
17th-century Italian painters
Italian male painters
18th-century Italian painters
Painters from Mantua
Painters from Parma
Italian Baroque painters
Italian battle painters
Year of birth uncertain
1650s births
1716 deaths
18th-century Italian male artists